A cure is a completely effective treatment for a disease.

Cure, or similar, may also refer to:

Places
 Cure (river), a river in France
 Cures, Sabinum, an ancient Italian town
 Cures, Sarthe, a commune in western France

People
 Curate or curé, a rank of priest
 Cure (surname)

Arts, entertainment and media

Films
 Cure (film), a 1997 film directed by Kiyoshi Kurosawa
 The Cure (1917 film), a short film starring Charlie Chaplin
 The Cure (1995 film), a drama starring Brad Renfro and Joseph Mazzello
 The Cure (2014 film), a thriller starring Antonia Prebble and Daniel Lissing
 Cured (film), a 2020 American documentary film
 The Cured (2017), an Irish horror film

Music

Groups
The Cure, an English rock band
The Cure discography

Albums
 Cured (album), a 1981 album by Steve Hackett
 The Cure (Jah Cure album)
 The Cure (Keith Jarrett album), a live album by American pianist Keith Jarrett's "Standards Trio"
 The Cure (Manning album), the second studio album released by Guy Manning
The Cure, a 2011 album by Rza from the Wu-Tang Clan
 The Cure (The Cure album), the eponymous 12th studio album by The Cure
 The Cure (The Saw Doctors album), the 6th studio recording by Irish rock band The Saw Doctors

Songs
 "Cure", by Metallica from Load
 "The Cure" (song), by Lady Gaga
 "The Cure", by Jordin Sparks from Battlefield
 "The Cure", by Little Mix from LM5
"A Cure", by Blonde Redhead from Melody of Certain Damaged Lemons

Periodicals
 Cure (magazine), a Japanese music and style magazine

Television 
 The Cure (TV series), a 2018 Philippine TV series

TV episodes
 "Cure" (Stargate SG-1)
 "The Cure" (Fantastic Four)
 The Cure (Fringe), the sixth episode of the American television series Fringe
 "The Cure" (The Shield)
 "The Cure" (X-Men), a 1993 episode in the animated TV series X-Men Animated Series

Organizations (acronyms)
 Citizens United for Rehabilitation of Errants, a United States prisoner support and prison reform organization
 Citizens United for Research in Epilepsy, a non-profit organization based in Chicago, Illinois
 Coalition to Uproot Ragging from Education, non-profit NGO in India, dedicated to the elimination of ragging in India
 Coalition on Urban Renewal and Education

Sciences
 Curing (chemistry), the process of hardening a polymer material
 Curing (food preservation), a food preservation technique
 Curing of concrete, the process of hardening Portland cement requiring water
 Curing of tobacco, to prepare it for use
 Sulfur vulcanization, the process of hardening or "curing" rubber

Other uses
 CURE Children's Hospital of Uganda, a pediatric neurosurgery hospital in Uganda
 Cure (religion), the practical exercise of an ecclesiastical office
 21st Century Cures Act, 2016 U.S. federal legislation
 CURE International, a medical charity organization
Project C.U.R.E.

See also

 Kure (disambiguation)
 Remission (disambiguation)